The Paavo Nurmi Games is an annual track and field meet that takes place at Paavo Nurmi Stadium in Turku, Finland. It was first held in 1957. The competition has been part of the IAAF World Challenge since 2017.

Meeting records

Men

Women

References

External links
Official website
Stadium records

European Athletic Association meetings
Athletics competitions in Finland
Recurring sporting events established in 1957
1957 establishments in Finland
Sport in Turku
Games
Summer events in Finland